Kamal Bahadur Adhikari (born July 20, 1977) is a Nepalese weightlifter. Adhikari represented Nepal at the 2008 Summer Olympics in Beijing, where he competed for the men's lightweight category. He finished 20th of 22 who completed both aspects, as he lifted 114 kg in the snatch, and hoisted 154 kg from his third and final attempt in the clean and jerk, for a total of 268 kg.

Adhikari took up weightlifting in 2000 and started competing while serving in the army. He studied at the Nepal Art College and coached a fellow weightlifter Manita Shrestha. At the 2018 Asian Games he served as the flag bearer for Nepal at the opening ceremony.

References

External links
 

NBC 2008 Olympics profile

Nepalese male weightlifters
1977 births
Living people
People from Chitwan District
Olympic weightlifters of Nepal
Weightlifters at the 2008 Summer Olympics
Weightlifters at the 2006 Asian Games
Weightlifters at the 2010 Asian Games
Weightlifters at the 2014 Asian Games
Weightlifters at the 2018 Asian Games
South Asian Games gold medalists for Nepal
Asian Games competitors for Nepal
South Asian Games medalists in weightlifting
21st-century Nepalese people